The 2012 ICC Under-19 Cricket World Cup was a one-day cricket competition for sixteen international U-19 cricketing teams which was held in August 2012. This was the ninth time that the tournament was held since its inception back in 1988. The tournament was held in Australia for the second time after previously hosting it in 1988 with the tournament being held across three cities (Brisbane, Sunshine Coast and Townsville).

Six teams qualified from the qualifying event as they joined the full members that automatically qualified through to the World Cup. The teams were separated into four groups of four with the top two teams qualifying through to the Super League while the bottom two will compete in the Plate Championship. After finishing second in their group, India beat Australia in the final by six wickets to win their third title after previously winning in 2000 and 2008. India's Unmukt Chand scored 111 not out, facing 130 balls and was awarded Man of the Final. Australian captain Will Bosisto was awarded Man of the Series.
Canada was originally scheduled to be the host of the event, after being selected as hosts in 2007.

Qualification

16 teams participated in the competition. The 10 nations with ICC Full Membership automatically qualified for the tournament. Ten further teams competed in the qualifying event which was held in Ireland with only the top six teams qualifying through to the 2012 World Cup. Scotland (winners), Nepal, Ireland, Afghanistan, Papua New Guinea and Namibia all finished in the top 6 to book their spot into the World Cup.

Groups
The following groups were chosen for the World Cup 2012 by the International Cricket Council. The number alongside gives the rank of the team. The tournament will begin with a league stage consisting of four groups of four. Each team will play each of the other teams in its group once.

Group A
 (1)
 (8)
 (12)
 (13)

Group B
 (2)
 (7)
 (11)
 (14)

Group C
 (3)
 (6)
 (10)
 (15)

Group D
 (4)
 (5)
 (9)
 (16)

Squads

Each country selected a 15-man squad for the tournament.

Fixtures
Fixtures as follows:-

Warm-up games

Group stage

 The top 2 teams from each group qualified for the knock-out rounds of the tournament.
 The bottom 2 teams from each group take part in a Plate competition knock-out.

Group A

Group B

Group C

Group D

Knockout stages

Plate Championship

9th place play-off quarter-finals

9th place play-off semi-finals

13th place play-off semi-finals

15th place play-off

13th place play-off

11th place play-off

Plate Final

Super League

Quarter-finals

Semi-finals

5th place play-off semi-finals

7th place play-off

5th place play-off

3rd place play-off

Final

Final standings

 Qualify for the 2014 U-19 World Cup as full members.

See also

 ICC Under-19 Cricket World Cup
 International Cricket Council

References

External links
 Official website (archived September 2012)
 Tournament site on ESPN CricInfo

ICC Under-19 Cricket World Cup
Icc Under-19 Cricket World Cup, 2012
ICC Under-19
Sport in Townsville
Cricket in Queensland
International cricket competitions in Australia
2012 ICC Under-19 Cricket World Cup